John Ajvide Lindqvist (born 2 December 1968) is a Swedish writer of horror novels and short stories.

Early life
Lindqvist was born and raised in the Stockholm suburb of Blackeberg. Before becoming a published writer, Lindqvist worked for 12 years as a stand-up comedian, and also worked for a time as a magician.

Career
Lindqvist's debut novel, Let the Right One In (Låt den rätte komma in), a romantic vampire horror story published in 2004, enjoyed great success in Sweden and abroad. Handling the Undead (Hanteringen av odöda) was published in 2005 and involved the rising of the dead as zombies, referred to as the "re-living", in the Stockholm area.

In 2006, he released his third book, Pappersväggar (Paper Walls, published in English as Let the Old Dreams Die), a collection of short stories. In 2007, his story "Tindalos" was published as a serial in the Swedish newspaper Dagens Nyheter and as a free audiobook available through the newspaper's website, read by the author himself. His works are published in Sweden by Ordfront and have been translated into many languages, including English, Bulgarian, German, Italian, Spanish, Chinese, Hindi, Norwegian, Danish, French, Polish, Czech, Dutch and Russian.

Lindqvist was also a writer for the television series  (1999) and wrote the screenplays for Sveriges Television's drama series Kommissionen (2005) and the film Let the Right One In, based on his novel. 

The production company Tre Vänner bought the film rights to Handling the Undead and were planning a future production. However, heavy interest in an American version led to the request to sell the rights to an American company. Lindqvist refused and the film went unmade. Tre Vänner's rights for an adaptation expired in 2012.

Inspirations
Lindqvist is a Morrissey fan. The name of his debut novel was inspired by the Morrissey song "Let the Right One Slip In" and one of the short stories in Pappersväggar was named after the song "Shoplifters of the World Unite". The influence of Morrissey's music became involved in the actual plot of Harbour, where two of the main characters are devoted Morrissey fans who live out much of their lives by speaking in quotes from Morrissey's songs.

Lindqvist's father drowned  , and the sea has appeared in several of his works as a dark and sinister force, such as in Handling the Undead and a short story in Pappersväggar. In Harbour the sea has a prominent role as a menacing presence and could be considered the villain of the novel. Furthermore, Let the Right One In features a pivotal near-drowning scene in a gym swimming pool.

Bibliography
2004 – Låt den rätte komma in (Let the Right One In, 2007)
2005 – Hanteringen av odöda (Handling the Undead, 2009)
2006 – Pappersväggar (Paper Walls)
2008 – Människohamn (Harbour, 2010)
2010 – Lilla stjärna (Little Star, 2011)
2011 – Låt de gamla drömmarna dö (Let the Old Dreams Die)
2011 – Tjärven (name of a lighthouse island, see separate article)
2011 - The Music of Bengt Karlsson, Murderer
2011 - "Itsy Bitsy" (short story)
2012 - Sulky och Bebbe regerar okej (Sulky and Bebbe Rule Okay; with Mia Ajvide)
2013 - Fem kända musiker döda i seriekrock (Five Famous Musicians Dead in Pile-Up)
2013 - Come Unto Me
2014 - Himmelstrand (I Am Behind You(: The First Place))
2014 - "Speciella omständigheter" ("Special Circumstances"; short story)
2015 - Rörelsen: Den andra platsen (The Movement: The Second Place)
2016 - Våran hud, vårat blod, våra ben (Our Skin, Our Blood, Our Bones)
2017 - X: Den sista platsen (X: The Last Place) (I Am the Tiger)
2017 - The Keeper's Companion (novel i anthology Varsel i Mörkret)
2018 - Gräns (Border)
2021 - Vänligheten (The Kindness)
2022 - Verkligheten (The Reality)

Plays
2012 - Fem kända musiker döda i seriekrock
2012 - Ett informellt samtal om den nuvarande situationen
2014 - Storstugan - En pyromans berättelse

Film and TV adaptions
 Let the Right One In (film)
 Let Me In (film)
 Let the Right One In (TV series)
 Border (film)

Notes

References

External links
 
 John Ajvide Lindqvist: Stand Up, 1995 on YouTube

Living people
Swedish horror writers
Writers from Stockholm
Swedish comedians
Sommar (radio program) hosts
1968 births
Selma Lagerlöf Prize winners
Best Screenplay Guldbagge Award winners
Swedish male novelists